Giorgia Würth (born 5 June 1981) is a Swiss-Italian television presenter and actress.

External links

1981 births
Living people
Mass media people from Genoa
Actresses from Milan
Italian television actresses
Italian film actresses
20th-century Italian actresses
21st-century Italian actresses
Italian television presenters
Swiss expatriates in Italy
Swiss television actresses
Swiss film actresses
20th-century Swiss actresses
21st-century Swiss actresses
Swiss television presenters
Swiss women television presenters
Italian women television presenters